Kamenar Point (‘Nos Kamenar’ \'nos ka-me-'nar\) is the narrow rocky point on Davis Coast in Graham Land, Antarctica projecting 650 m northwards into Jordanoff Bay and forming the east side of the entrance to Hvoyna Cove. The point is named after the two settlements of Kamenar in northeastern and southeastern Bulgaria.

Location
German-British mapping in 1996.

Maps
Trinity Peninsula. Scale 1:250000 topographic map No. 5697. Institut für Angewandte Geodäsie and British Antarctic Survey, 1996.
Antarctic Digital Database (ADD). Scale 1:250000 topographic map of Antarctica. Scientific Committee on Antarctic Research (SCAR), 1993–2016.

References
 Bulgarian Antarctic Gazetteer. Antarctic Place-names Commission. (details in Bulgarian, basic data in English)
 Kamenar Point. SCAR Composite Antarctic Gazetteer

External links
 Kamenar Point. Copernix satellite image

Headlands of Graham Land
Davis Coast
Bulgaria and the Antarctic